Chehel Shahid Rural District is a rural district (dehestan) in the Central District of Ramsar County, Mazandaran Province, Iran. At the 2006 census, its population was 9,584, in 2,707 families. The rural district has 43 villages.

References 

Rural Districts of Mazandaran Province
Ramsar County